Bell station is an elevated busway station operated by Pittsburgh Regional Transit in Carnegie, Pennsylvania. The station is located on the West Busway and is served by routes 28X   G2, G3 and G31. The station is located at the busway's crossing over Rosslyn Avenue and is named for nearby Bell Avenue.

Just south of this station, routes 28X Airport Flyer and G3 Moon Flyer connect with Interstate 376 via dedicated ramps.

The station has a 34-space park and ride lot.

References

Port Authority of Allegheny County stations
Bus stations in Pennsylvania
West Busway